Pierre-Antoine-Jean Bach (29 July 1932 – 26 June 2020) was a French-born Laotian Roman Catholic bishop.

Bach was born in France and was ordained to the priesthood in 1959. He served as the Roman Catholic bishop of the Apostolic Vicariate of Savannakhet. Laos, from 1971 to 1975.

Notes

1932 births
2020 deaths
French Roman Catholic bishops in Asia
20th-century Roman Catholic bishops in Laos
French emigrants to Laos